Mabel Lost and Won is a 1915 American short comedy film directed by and starring Mabel Normand. The supporting cast includes Owen Moore as her love interest, Alice Davenport as her mother, and Fontaine La Rue (billed as Dora Rogers) as a vamp.

Cast
Mabel Normand as Mabel
Owen Moore as Mabel's fiancé
Alice Davenport as Mabel's mother
Fontaine La Rue (billed as Dora Rogers) as the vamp
Hugh Fay as the vamp's friend
Mack Swain as the vamp's husband
Ollie Carlyle as the maid

References

External links
 
 

1915 films
Silent American comedy films
American black-and-white films
American silent short films
1915 comedy films
1915 short films
Films directed by Mabel Normand
American comedy short films
1910s American films
1910s English-language films